Gene Vance Jr. Day is a commemorative Military Appreciation Day named for Gene Arden Vance Jr. and recognized annually during May in the United States by the State of West Virginia. Occurring during Military Appreciation Month and U.S. Armed Forces Week, it honors the legacy of American soldiers who returned home from the Global War on Terror (GWOT), the longest ongoing war in U.S. history, remembers and mourns the fallen and supports the wounded. Official observances are proclaimed annually on May 18 in the City of Morgantown, West Virginia in a citywide ceremony that includes official proclamations, state and local governmental and military leadership addresses and greetings, wreath laying memorializing the names of fallen soldiers from West Virginia, guest speakers and participation from national organizations, musical performances and events to raise awareness for those wounded in the conflict. The day is organized annually by the Gene Vance Jr. Foundation, the West Virginia Army National Guard, City of Morgantown and State of West Virginia.

Framing the Gene Vance Jr. Day are two other U.S. military appreciation days that occur nationally in May, Armed Forces Day, which honors those currently serving followed by Memorial Day, a public holiday honoring and mourning the military personnel who have died while serving in the United States Armed Forces. The Gene Vance Jr. Day is distinct from other U.S. military appreciation days in that it is named for an American military hero and specifically honors American service members and their allies who served and were wounded in a single notable ongoing conflict (GWOT) as well as those who perished in the conflict.

COVID-19 pandemic 
On May 16, 2020 amidst the COVID-19 pandemic, founder of the day Michael M.J. Minc spearheaded the 9th annual Gene Vance Jr. Day by creating a virtual event on US Armed Forces Day that also recognized everyone involved in the fight against COVID-19. Entitled ‘United in Spirit’ it brought together national government leaders like Senators Joseph Manchin III, Shelley Moore Capito, WV Governor Jim Justice, Morgantown Mayor Bill Kawecki, military leaders like Adjutant General of the West Virginia Army National Guard, Major General James A. Hoyer, education leaders E. Gordon Gee of West Virginia University and President Mirta Martin of Fairmont State University as well as those on the frontlines of the pandemic.

The goal of the virtual ceremony was to inspire hope and unite people during a time of global social and economic disruption on a day which historically honors those on the front lines of the Global War on Terror. It included President David S. Goldberg, C.E.O of Mon Health System, the parent company of Mon Health Medical Center, prayer from Christian and Jewish religious leaders along with local musical performers like Davisson Brothers Band, American Idol contestant and country musician Cody Clayton Eagle, Morgantown Vox Principalis Choral Association, Singer songwriters Eric Lewis and Rick Martin.

Presidential and congressional commendation  
On May 15, 2021 Vance’s brother-in-law and founder of the day Michael M.J. Minc, spearheaded a virtual tribute on U.S. Armed Forces Day to celebrate the 10th Anniversary of the Gene Vance Jr. Day and commemorate the 20th Anniversary year of the September 11 attacks. It also honored the memory of COVID-19 pandemic victims and encouraged COVID-19 vaccination in the United States in support of ongoing mass immunization efforts. 

Entitled ‘United in Spirit 2021, American Tribute 10’, it received a letter of commendation from the 46th president of the United States, Joe Biden who is also commander-in-chief of the US Armed Forces, praising the Gene Vance Jr. Foundation’s efforts aimed at improving the quality of life for wounded veterans.

The 10th Gene Vance Jr. Day brought together prominent U.S. government and military leaders with commendation messages from Senators Joseph Manchin III, Shelley Moore Capito and West Virginia Governor Jim Justice. General Austin S. Miller, former commander of U.S. Army and NATO forces in Afghanistan, State Adjutant General of the West Virginia National Guard, Brigadier General William Crane, Colonel Gary M Hausman, former Commandant of the Defense Language Institute Foreign Language Center and Command Sergeant Major Dennis Riggs of Vance’s unit the 19th Special Forces Group (Airborne) also participated. 

Prayer from Christian and Jewish military chaplains from the Army and U.S. Marine Corps, a virtual wreath laying by Daughters of the American Revolution (DAR) Woodburn Chapter Regent, Cynthia Harper along with messages from education leader President E. Gordon Gee and the 45th President General of DAR, Denise Doring VanBuren were included in the memorial ceremony. 

State leaders on the frontlines of the COVID-19 pandemic included West Virginia Coronavirus “czar”, Dr.Clay Marsh and retired Adjutant General of the West Virginia National Guard Joint Forces, Major General James A. Hoyer, Director of the WV Covid-19 Joint Interagency Task Force (JIATF) encouraged vaccination as well as unity during a time of social disruption. Local leaders included the 150th Mayor of Morgantown, WV Ron Delaney Jr. as well as Patriot Guard Riders WV Ride Captain Douglas D. Geary. 

The goals of the virtual ceremony, created amidst the ongoing coronavirus pandemic, gave people who may not have been able to attend in person the ability to participate. This included musical performers nationwide like Dr.Letícia Grützmann leading the Carroll University Choirs in Waukesha, Wisconsin, David Winans II of the Winans family leading his band PI in Detroit, Michigan as well as California based actor, composer, singer, songwriter Abri van Straten husband of Kristin Bauer van Straten and Oregon based blues artist Ben Rice. Musical performers from West Virginia included Chief Warrant Officer Jeremiah Bennett leading the 249th United States Army Band, Chris and Donnie Davisson of the Davisson Brothers Band,  American Idol contestant and country musician Cody Clayton Eagle and singer songwriters Eric Lewis and Rick Martin who debuted their musical response to the Pandemic during the broadcast.

Decade of growth and expansion  
The Gene Vance Jr. Day has grown and expanded since its inception ten years ago. Founder Michael M. J. Minc’s (pronounced “Mintz”) efforts collectively as Vance’s brother in-law, close friend and leader of the Gene Vance Jr. Foundation, Bud’s Bold Brew and the Gene Vance Jr. Day together with the U.S. military, local and federal organizations have kept Vance’s memory alive. The day together with buildings, a military installation, a bridge, roads and a trail in locations all over the world, are dedicated in Vance’s honor.

The inaugural commemorative Gene Vance Jr. Day in 2012 was a small ceremony in Vance’s hometown, the City of Morgantown WV, that included celebrating Vance’s life as an American hero, distinguished member of the local community and WVNG during the U.S. military appreciation month of May, the month in which Vance was killed in action. Over the past 10 years, Minc spearheaded the day to include dignitaries, prominent leaders, military personnel, guests, active events, live musical performances, tributes to military, first responders and others. 

The COVID-19 pandemic caused the 2020, 2021 and 2022 editions of the ceremony to become virtual further expanding the day, participation and attendance.

2022 Russian invasion of Ukraine  
On May 21, 2022, US Armed Forces Day, amidst the 2022 Russian invasion of Ukraine, Vance’s brother in-law and founder Michael M.J. Minc created and broadcast a 3rd virtual tribute event to celebrate the 11th Anniversary of the Gene Vance Jr. Day and commemorate the 20th anniversary of Vance’s death during the 21st Anniversary year of 9/11. 

Entitled ‘American Freedom Tribute XI' it included messages of support for the people and soldiers of Ukraine from prominent US state and national leaders. A variety of messages from annual participants were broadcast including honoring the role of the West Virginia National Guard and WVU during the COVID-19 pandemic. A special greeting letter of commendation from the Governor of West Virginia, Jim Justice thanked Minc and the foundation he founded in Vance's name for their role.  

The virtual event featured a variety of music from several performers who participate annually including the 249th United States Army Band and the Davisson Brothers from West Virginia. Musicians from various states again paid tribute with messages in honor of the day including  California based actor, composer, singer, songwriter Abri van Straten and Oregon based blues artist Ben Rice.

History 
Gene Arden (“Buddy”) Vance Jr. was a native of the State of West Virginia, a West Virginia University alumnus, a City of Morgantown, West Virginia resident and decorated national hero who was a member of the West Virginia Army National Guard (WVARNG) 2nd Battalion, 19th Special Forces Group Airborne Forces. Vance was a cryptologic linguist who, despite being critically wounded, helped save the lives of two fellow Americans and 18 Afghan soldiers during the hunt for Osama Bin Laden in the War in Afghanistan (2001–14).

Founded in the City of Morgantown on May 18, 2012, ten years following Vance's fatal shooting, it was created by the Gene Vance Jr. Foundation's founder Michael M.J. Minc, Vance's brother in-law, with support from officials representing West Virginia, Morgantown, West Virginia Army National Guard, West Virginia University, business and media organizations.
 
Remembrances at select military installations bearing Vance's name throughout the United States are also held to coincide with the day. In 2019 the town of Oceana, West Virginia joined the City of Morgantown in declaring May 18 Gene Vance Jr. Day.

The day often coincides with U.S. Armed Forces Day and on occasion National Police Week. Annual addresses by both military and police leadership highlight the importance of community service. In the City of Morgantown, home of West Virginia University, the former chief of police Edward Preston is also a U.S. Marine and published author.

Officially designated by Congress in 1999, Military Appreciation Month takes place every year throughout the entire month of May. Every year, the president issues an annual proclamation reminding Americans to celebrate this patriotic month that pays tribute to those who have sacrificed much for freedom.

Annual participants of the Gene Vance Jr. Day

NATIONAL BODIES 
United States Senate
U.S. Department of Defense (DoD)United States Army Special Forces
U.S. Department of Defense (DoD), Defense Language Institute (DFLI) 
U.S. Department of Defense (DoD), Goodfellow Air Force Base (USAF)
U.S. Department of Defense (DoD) West Virginia National Guard (WVNG)
Daughters of the American Revolution (NSDAR, DAR)
Patriot Guard Riders (PGR)
Gene Vance Jr. Foundation (GVJF)

STATE BODIES
West Virginia Legislature
Governors of West Virginia
West Virginia University (WVU)

LOCAL BODIES
 City of Morgantown, West Virginia
 Town of Oceana, West Virginia

References

External links
2022 Letter from Governor Jim Justice

Awareness days